The Loo of the Year Awards are run to celebrate the best public toilets in the United Kingdom, and promote high standards. 

The awards competition receives sponsorship from a number of companies involved in providing products and services to washroom providers.

History
First introduced in 1987, the Loo of the Year Awards competition has run annually, except for 1993.

Eligibility criteria
Any type of public facility ('away from home' toilet) can be nominated for consideration. There are sixty one award categories. Eligible facilities can be located in England, Scotland, Wales or Ireland.

Anyone can submit a nomination—staff, customers, visitors, managers, owners or contractors—but owners or managers must authorise entries.

Judging criteria
After an unannounced inspection from an authorised Loo of the Year Awards Inspector, nominees are graded on a scale from Silver to Diamond.  Grades are awarded based on one hundred and one criteria, and are judged on both male and female facilities, as well as any baby changing and accessible facilities provided. The criteria include cleanliness, decor, signage, accessibility and customer care.

Awards
Awards are given in one of sixty one categories. An entrant receiving a Diamond or possibly a Platinum grading will be considered for one a number of major national awards in each of England, Scotland, Wales and Ireland:

National Category Winners (up to sixty-one categories in each country)
National Accessible Toilet Winner
National (Baby) Changing Facilities Winner
Public Toilet Entries - National Winner
Individual Category Entries - National Winner
Changing Places Toilet Entries - National Winner
Space to Change Toilet Entries - National Winner
Eco Friendly Toilet - National Winner
Local Authority Award - National Winner
Toilets in Education - National Winner
Hygiene Room - National Winner

Other awards include:

Individual UK Loo of the Year Trophy The winner of this award is selected from one of the eight national winners in the Public Toilet Entries and the Individual Category Entries categories above.
UK Corporate Provider Trophy The winner of this award is selected from organizations or authorities entering ten or more different locations and winning five or more five-star awards.
Champions' League – Standards of Excellence Awards This award is presented to organizations or local authorities winning five or more five-star awards and who, in the inspectors' opinion, are maintaining a consistently high standard of management in all their Loo of the Year Awards entries.
Local Authority Premier League Membership in the League is granted to the top twenty local authority public toilet providers.
Attendant of the Year Awards These "people awards" are open to all full-time attendants, as well as employed cleaning staff and retained cleaning contractors. Separate Attendant of the Year Award Certificates are awarded in England, Scotland, Wales and Northern Ireland with Commended and National Winners for each country.

In addition, the overall UK winner (either an individual, in-house cleaning team or external contractor) is awarded the UK Washroom Cleaner of The Year Trophy.

Overall "Loo of the Year" trophy winners

The winner of this category is presented with a Golden Loo Seat Trophy.

See also
The Good Loo Guide

References

External links
Loo of the Year Award

British awards
Design awards
Public toilets
1987 establishments in the United Kingdom
Awards established in 1987
Annual events in the United Kingdom